Bagepalli Assembly constituency is one of the 224 constituencies in the Karnataka Legislative Assembly of Karnataka a south state of India. It is also part of Chikkaballapur Lok Sabha constituency.

Members of Legislative Assembly

Mysore State
 1951-1962: Seat did not exist

 1962: B. Subbarayappa, Indian National Congress

 1967: A. Muniyappa, Indian National Congress

 1972: Renuka Rajendran, Indian National Congress

Karnataka State
 1978: S.Muni Kaju, Indian National Congress (Indira)

 1983: A. V. Appaswamy Reddy, Communist Party of India (Marxist)

 1985: B. Narayana Swamy, Indian National Congress

 1989: C. V. Venkatarayappa, Indian National Congress

 1994: G. V. Srirama Reddy, Communist Party of India (Marxist)

 1999: N. Sampangi, Independent

 2004: G. V. Srirama Reddy, Communist Party of India (Marxist)

 2008: N. Sampangi, Indian National Congress

 2013: S. N. Subbareddy, Independent

See also
 Chikballapur district
 List of constituencies of Karnataka Legislative Assembly

References

Assembly constituencies of Karnataka
Chikkaballapur district